Palpita lautopennis is a moth in the family Crambidae. It was described by Inoue in 1997. It is found in Indonesia (Sumatra).

References

Moths described in 1997
Palpita
Moths of Indonesia